Alegna Aryday González Muñoz (born 2 January 1999) is a Mexican racewalking athlete who competed in the women's 20 kilometres walk at the 2020 Summer Olympics and obtained 5th place. She has been designated by the press at the "Mexican racewalking princess" for her success at a young age.

Career
González began training in the sport of athletics while in primary school, coached by her two uncles who had themselves been marathon runners. She often practiced in the evening due to the extreme heat. González was spotted by Ignacio Zamudio at the 2015  (National Olympics), who was impressed by her technique and offered to coach her. In May 2017, González won the 10,000 metre under-20 (U20) track race at the 18th Pan American Race Walking Cup in Peru. She returned to the country a few months later for the 2017 Pan American U20 Athletics Championships, where she won gold in the 10,000 metre track race with a championship (and national U20) record time of 44:43.89.

González broke her own continental U20 (road) record with a time of 45:08 to win gold in the junior 10 km race at the 2018 World Race Walking Team Championships. She then won a gold medal in the 10,000 metre event at the 2018 World U20 Championships in Finland with a time of 44:13.88, setting a new continental U20 record on the track as well. She was also invited to the IAAF International Gala in Monaco. González was the first Mexican athlete to attend since Ana Guevara in 2002.

In April 2019, González finished second in the 20 km event at the Poděbrady Race Walking Meet with an Olympic standard time of 1:30:21, becoming the first Mexican athlete to secure her spot at the 2020 Summer Olympics. However, she suffered a knee injury that forced her to miss that year's Summer Universiade, Pan American Games and World Championships. She had qualified for all three events but ultimately decided to undergo surgery in June to ensure a full recovery. After the outbreak of the COVID-19 pandemic, González had to wait until December 2020 to compete again. In her return to competition, she captured the gold medal at the Central American Championships in Costa Rica in a time of 45:27.26 in the 10,000 m walk.

González opened her 2021 season by winning the 20 km race at the Costa Rican Race Walking Championships in 1:34:02 as an invited guest. In June she set a new personal best in the discipline at the Gran Premio Cantonés de La Coruña in Spain, recording a time of 1:28:40 for a second-place finish. The following week, González won the Mexican national title in the 10,000 m walk. At the delayed 2020 Olympic Games, she placed fifth in the women's 20 kilometres walk with a time of 1.30:33.

González placed fourth in the 20 km event at the 2022 World Race Walking Team Championships in Muscat, narrowly missing out on the podium with a time of 1:32:45. She captured another national title, this time in the 20 km walk, to qualify for the 2022 World Championships.

Personal life
González grew up with a single mother in Ojinaga, Chihuahua. She moved from Ojinaga to Mexico City at the age of 16 to further her athletic development.

Achievements
All information taken from World Athletics profile.

Personal bests
Track walk
5000 m walk – 22:06.40 (Mexico City 2021)
10,000 m walk – 44:13.88 (Tampere 2018)

Road walk
10 km walk – 45:08 (Taicang 2018)
20 km walk – 1:28:40 (La Coruña 2021)

International competitions

National titles
 Mexican Athletics Championships
 10,000 metres walk: 2021
 20 km walk: 2022

References

External links
 

 

1999 births
Living people
Mexican female racewalkers
Athletes (track and field) at the 2020 Summer Olympics
Olympic athletes of Mexico
Sportspeople from Chihuahua (state)
People from Ojinaga, Chihuahua
21st-century Mexican women